The 2013 Rangitikei local elections were held across the Rangitikei District of Manawatū-Whanganui, New Zealand, for the offices of Mayor of Rangitikei and eleven members of the Rangitikei District Council on 12 October 2013. They were held as part of the 2013 New Zealand local elections. Postal ballots were issued to 9,866 registered voters, and were returned from 23 September to 12 October. Across the district, 4,856 people cast votes, a voter turnout of 49.22%. Some voters chose not to vote in particular elections or referendums, so voter turnout in individual elections varies from this figure.

Andy Watson was elected as mayor with 41.5% of the vote, defeating incumbent mayor Chalky Leary. First past the post (FPP) was used to elect the eleven members of the Rangitikei District Council—four from the Marton ward, three from the Taihape ward, two from the Bulls ward and one each from the Hunterville and Turakina wards.

The previous local elections took place in October 2010 and the following elections will take place in October 2016.

Mayor

Former two-term deputy mayor Andy Watson was elected, defeating incumbent mayor Chalky Leary by a 486-vote majority.

District council

Bulls ward
The two candidates with the most votes were elected, shown in the table below by a green tick.

Hunterville ward
As there were no other candidates, Dean McManaway was re-elected unopposed.

Marton ward
The four candidates with the most votes were elected, shown in the table below by a green tick. Candidates shown with a cross lost their seats as incumbent councillors.

Taihape ward
The three candidates with the most votes were elected, shown in the table below by a green tick. Candidates shown with a cross lost their seats as incumbent councillors.

Turakina ward
As there were no other candidates, Soraya Peke-Mason was re-elected unopposed.

See also
2013 Rangitikei mayoral election
2013 New Zealand local elections

Table footnotes

References

Rangitikei
Politics of Rangitikei
Rangitikei